Sir David Hare is an English playwright and screenwriter.

For his work in film, he has received two Academy Award for Best Adapted Screenplay nominations for Stephen Daldry's films The Hours (2002), and The Reader (2008). He also received three British Academy Film Awards nominations, and two Golden Globe Award nominations. For his work on television he received two British Academy Television Award nominations winning for Tickling Hitler in 1979.

For his theatrical works he has received eight Laurence Olivier Award nominations for his work on the West End. He won two Olivier's for Racing Demon in 1990 and Skylight in 1996. For his work on the Broadway stage he has received three Tony Award for Best Play nominations for Plenty in 1985, Racing Demon in 1996 and Skylight in 1997.

Major associations

Academy Awards

BAFTA Awards

Golden Globe Awards

Laurence Olivier Awards

Tony Awards

Miscellaneous awards

Berlin Film Festival 
 1985 Berlin Film Festival Golden Bear for Wetherby

Drama Desk Award 
 1999 Drama Desk Award for Outstanding One-Person Show for Via Dolorosa

Evening Standard Awards 
 1995 Evening Standard Award for Best Play for Pravda

London Theatre Critics' Award 
 1990 London Theatre Critics' Award for Best Play for Racing Demon

New York Critics Circle 
 1983 New York Drama Critics' Circle Award for Best Foreign Play for Plenty
 1997 New York Drama Critics' Circle Award for Best Foreign Play for Skylight
 1999 New York Drama Critics' Circle Special Citation for Amy's View, The Blue Room, and Via Dolorosa

Pinter Prize 
 2011 PEN/Pinter Prize

Honours 
 He was elected a Fellow of the Royal Society of Literature in 1985. This gave him the Post Nominal Letters "FRSL" for Life.
 He was awarded an Honorary Fellowship by Jesus College, Cambridge in 2001.
 He was knighted in the 1998 Queen's Birthday Honours List "For services to the Theatre". This allows him to use the title Sir.
 He was awarded the Honorary degree of Doctor of Letters (D.Litt) by the University of East Anglia in 2010.

References 

Hare, David